Rein Ratas (9 May 1938 – 18 April 2022) was an Estonian politician, representing the Estonian Centre Party. Ratas served in the Riigikogu 2007–2011 and again 2015–2018. Due to a lengthy illness, Ratas was substituted by Igor Kravtšenko from December 2016 until September 2018, when Ratas formally left his seat for Kravtšenko.

Ratas is the father of former Estonian Prime Minister Jüri Ratas.

References

1938 births
2022 deaths
21st-century Estonian politicians
Estonian Centre Party politicians
Members of the Riigikogu, 2007–2011
Members of the Riigikogu, 2015–2019
People from Häädemeeste Parish